Antona semicirculata is a moth of the subfamily Arctiinae first described by George Hampson in 1900. It is found in Ecuador and Bolivia.

References

Lithosiini
Moths described in 1900
Moths of South America